Brianna Elizabeth Visalli (born April 17, 1995) is an American professional soccer player who plays as a midfielder for Women's Super League club Brighton & Hove Albion. She has represented the United States at under-23 level. She also holds British citizenship.

Early life

Visalli was born in San Jose, California.  She has five siblings. Her mother is a dual US/UK citizen. She played six years of her youth career for the CV Chilipeppers and one year for the De Anza Force. She was also a four-year varsity player for Valley Christian High School.

College career 
Visalli was a four-year starter for the Pepperdine Waves, starting all but two games, setting a record for number of games played (83) and started (81) by an outfield player. She finished her Waves career second in game-winning goals (14) and seventh in total goals (25). In her senior year she was a semi-finalist for the Mac Hermann Trophy and was named the West Coast Conference Player of the Year.

Club career

Chicago Red Stars
After a college career at Pepperdine University, Visalli was drafted 19th in the 2018 NWSL College Draft by the Chicago Red Stars where she subsequently played for their reserve squad during their 2018 season.

West Ham United
Visalli signed for Women Super League club West Ham United in June 2018. She immediately became an integral part of the squad, appearing in 20 league matches and helping West Ham reach the 2018–19 FA Women's Cup final. She made a 62nd minute substitute appearance in the Final at Wembley Stadium as Manchester City won 3–0. In June 2019, it was announced that Visalli would leave West Ham upon the expiration of her contract.

Birmingham City
In July 2019, Visalli joined Birmingham City. Visalli played in eight games for the Blues in 2019, captaining the side in their away fixture against Brighton & Hove Albion.  She was ruled out of action until 2020 on December 5, 2019, after undergoing minor surgery for a medical condition. In total, Visalli made 13 appearances for Birmingham in all competitions before leaving as a free agent at the end of the season.

Houston Dash
In May 2020, Visalli signed a two-year contract with NWSL club Houston Dash ahead of the 2020 NWSL Challenge Cup.

Visalli made her club debut during the 2020 NWSL Challenge Cup, going on to win the tournament with the Dash. She would then make three appearances in the 2020 NWSL Fall Series.  Visalli made twenty appearances in all competitions in 2021 and nineteen appearances in 2022.  Out of contract at the end of 2022, Houston announced she would not return in 2023.

Brighton & Hove Albion
In 2023, she signed for Brighton & Hove Albion until the summer of 2024.

International career
Visalli has previously represented the United States at the U-23 level on three occasions.  As a dual citizen, through her English-born mother, Visalli is eligible to represent both the US and England at the senior level.

Career statistics

Club
.

References

1995 births
Living people
West Ham United F.C. Women players
Women's Super League players
Pepperdine Waves women's soccer players
Women's association football midfielders
American expatriate women's soccer players
Expatriate footballers in England
Chicago Red Stars draft picks
American women's soccer players
Soccer players from California
Birmingham City W.F.C. players
Houston Dash players
Brighton & Hove Albion W.F.C. players
American people of English descent
National Women's Soccer League players
De Anza Force women's players